William Pollak (born November 10, 1949, in Fair Lawn, New Jersey, United States) known by his stage name of Billy Price, is an American soul singer. He has lived in Pittsburgh, Pennsylvania, since the mid-1970s.

Career
Price attracted national attention in the mid-1970s during his three-year collaboration with blues guitarist Roy Buchanan. The pair toured the US and Canada, playing Carnegie Hall in New York City, the Newport Jazz Festival, the Roxy and Troubadour in Los Angeles, and the Spectrum in Philadelphia. After leaving Buchanan, Price formed the Keystone Rhythm Band, which toured the Eastern US on a circuit that stretched from Boston to Atlanta with large followings in Boston, Philadelphia, Washington, D.C.  and North Carolina. Sustaining several personnel changes, the band performed until 1990. He then formed The Billy Price Band, which currently consists of Lenny Smith (guitar), Tom Valentine (bass), Dave Dodd (drums), Jimmy Britton (keyboards), Eric Spaulding (tenor saxophone), and Joe Herndon (trumpet). The Billy Price Band won the Pittsburgh City Paper Reader's Poll award as Best Blues Band or Performer in 2021 and 2022.

In April, 2016, Price received a Legends of Pittsburgh Rock 'n Roll Award as a Modern Era Inductee. His 2015 recording with Otis Clay, This Time for Real, received a 2016 Blues Music Award (BMA) in the category of Soul Blues Album. His 2018 album Reckoning was nominated for a BMA in the category of Soul Blues Album. His most recent studio album, Dog Eat Dog, was also nominated for a BMA in the category of Soul Blues Album in 2020. Price was also nominated as Best Male Soul Blues Artist in 2020.

In 2022, Price released a 3-CD compilation of recordings from throughout his career titled 50+ Years of Soul on GetHip Recordings.

Though he works part-time in corporate communications at the Software Engineering Institute at Carnegie Mellon University, he continues to perform regularly in Pittsburgh, the eastern United States, and in Europe.

Discography
2022: 50+ Years of Soul, 3-CD compilation; GetHip Recordings
2019: Dog Eat Dog, recorded at Greaseland Studios, San Jose, CA; Gulf Coast Records
2018: Reckoning, recorded at Greaseland Studios, San Jose, CA; Vizztone label group
2017: Alive and Strange, live recording of the Billy Price Band at Club Café, Pittsburgh, PA, September 2016; Vizztone label group
2015: This Time For Real, with Otis Clay; Vizztone label group
2013: Strong, featuring the Billy Price Band and special guests Monster Mike Welch, Mark Wenner and Mark Stutso of The Nighthawks, and Fred Chapellier.
2010: Billy Price and Fred Chapellier Live on Stage, CD and DVD documenting the May 2009 Night Work tour, featuring French guitarist Fred Chapellier and his band and Billy Price Band keyboard player Jimmy Britton; recorded live at Espace Manureva, Charleville-Mézieres, France.
2009: Night Work, DixieFrog Records (France), with French guitarist Fred Chapellier and special guests Otis Clay and Mark Wenner of The Nighthawks.
2006: East End Avenue, 14 songs (13 original), including six co-written with Jon Tiven.
2003: Funky, Funky Soul, DVD of performance at the Belgium Rhythm & Blues Festival.
2002: Sworn Testimony: The Billy Price Band Live, Double-CD of April 2002 performance at the Ram's Head Tavern in Annapolis, Maryland.
1999: Can I Change My Mind, Collection of songs written specifically for Price by Jerry "Swamp Dogg" Williams.
1997: The Soul Collection, CD containing 16 soul songs including a duet with Otis Clay, "That's How It Is."
1993: Danger Zone, Price's first album without the Keystone Rhythm Band.
1988: Free At Last, Album with the Keystone Rhythm Band featuring songs written by Price and other members of the band.
1984: Live, Recording of Billy Price and the Keystone Rhythm Band live at the Wax Museum in Washington D.C.
1981, 1979: Is It Over?, They Found Me Guilty, CD of Price's first two albums with the Keystone Rhythm Band.

References

External links
Official website 
Billy Price Pittsburgh Music History
Billy Price, Pittsburgh's Soul Man, Pittsburgh Post-Gazette
An interview in June 2015 at Soul Express
Pittsburgh Legend Billy Price Looks Back on 50+ Years of Soul, Pittsburgh Post-Gazette

1949 births
Living people
Carnegie Mellon University alumni
Musicians from Pittsburgh
People from Fair Lawn, New Jersey
American soul musicians